Pseudocloeon is a genus of mayflies belonging to the family Baetidae.

The species of this genus are found in Northern America, Africa and Southeastern Asia.

Species

Species:

Pseudocloeon balcanicum 
Pseudocloeon bellum 
Pseudocloeon boettgeri

References

Baetidae